Above Derwent is a civil parish in the Borough of Allerdale in Cumbria, England. It lies entirely within the Lake District National Park.

At the 2011 Census the parish had a population of 1,198 in 514 households, a small decrease from the 2011 figure of 1,207 living in 516 households.

History
Above Derwent CP comprised the ancient townships of Braithwaite, Coledale or Portinscale, and Thornthwaite, and the chapelry of Newlands".

The population, according to the 1811 Census, was 668, "rising to 1115 in 1851 and then stable throughout the 19th Century".

Topography
The parish is bounded to the east by Derwent Water, the River Derwent and Bassenthwaite Lake, it includes sections of both lakes. To the West and South, the parish is bounded by the summit of Lord's Seat, the Whinlatter Pass, the summits of Grisedale Pike and Crag Hill, the Newlands Pass, and the summits of Robinson and Catbells.The parish comprises relatively low level land alongside and between both lakes, together with the Newlands Valley, and large areas of the surrounding fells. It includes the settlements of Braithwaite, Thornthwaite, Portinscale, Stair and Little Town. The A66 primary route enters the CP at its most northerly point, Beck Wythop.

Governance
Above Derwent has a parish council, the lowest tier of local government in England.

Above Derwent falls in the electoral ward of Derwent Valley. The total population of this ward taken at the 2011 Census was 1,615.

The parish is within the Workington constituency of the UK Parliament.  it is represented by Mark Jenkinson of the Conservative Party, who was first elected in the 2019 general election

See also

Listed buildings in Above Derwent

References

External links
 Cumbria County History Trust: Above Derwent (nb: provisional research only – see Talk page)

Civil parishes in Cumbria
Allerdale